Stanley Bevans (16 April 1934 – 7 August 2020) was an English professional footballer who played in the Football League for Stoke City. Stan Bevans became Stoke City's youngest ever player when he made his top flight debut in 1951, against Stanley Matthews' Blackpool.

Career
Bevans was born in Kingsley, Staffordshire and attended Cheadle County Secondary Modern School and he played football with Cheadle Catholics in the Cheadle Youth League before joining Stoke City in 1950. Bevans was called up by Bob McGrory to the first team for a match against Blackpool on 31 March 1951 after Roy Brown was ruled out with an injury. He became at the time Stoke's youngest debutant at the age of 16 years, 11 months and five days.

He was used as a back-up forward playing only when there was no other option and also spent two seasons in the reserves. In 1954–55 he played 11 times and scored once which came in a 3–1 defeat away at Luton Town 18 September 1954. He later went on to play for Macclesfield Town, Heanor Town, Freehay Rovers and Bolton Social Club.

Career statistics

References

English footballers
Stoke City F.C. players
Macclesfield Town F.C. players
English Football League players
1934 births
2020 deaths
Heanor Town F.C. players
Association football forwards